Faryab (also Romanized as Fāryāb, Fārīāb, and Fariyab; ; also known as Pārīāb, Paryāb, Pāy Āb, and Shahmorādi-ye Fāryāb) is a city  and capital of Faryab County, Kerman Province, Iran.  At the 2006 census, its population was 4,508, in 971 families.

References

Populated places in Faryab County

Cities in Kerman Province